The 2007 Northwestern Wildcats football team represented Northwestern University in the Big Ten Conference during the 2007 NCAA Division I FBS football season.  Pat Fitzgerald, in his second season at Northwestern, was the team's head coach.  The Wildcats played their homes games at Ryan Field in Evanston, Illinois.

Before the beginning of the 2007 season, Northwestern showed potential for improvement upon the previous year's record.  ESPN.com's Mark Schlabach stated that Northwestern has the seventh easiest schedule in college football, and SI.com's Steve Megargee claimed that Indiana was the only Big Ten school with an easier schedule.  Running back Tyrell Sutton was one of 64 players in college football to be put on the Maxwell Award watch list for the nation's best college football player.

On October 7, quarterback C. J. Bachér broke Brett Basanez's school record for single-game passing yards by throwing for 520 yards in a victory over Michigan State. Bachér went on to be named the Walter Camp National Offensive Player of the Week and the Big Ten Conference Offensive Player of the Week. Another strong performance in a win against Minnesota earned Bachér Big Ten Conference Offensive Player of the Week honors for the second week in a row.

Schedule

References

Northwestern
Northwestern Wildcats football seasons
Northwestern Wildcats football